Ryan Smith (born September 7, 1993) is an American football cornerback who is a free agent. He was drafted by the Buccaneers in the fourth round of the 2016 NFL Draft. He played college football for the North Carolina Central Eagles.

Early life 
Ryan Smith was born in Germany on September 7, 1993, to parents Damon and Traci Richardson, and raised in Clinton, Maryland, where he spent the majority of his childhood. He moved to Upper Marlboro, Maryland in high school, where he attended Dr. Henry A. Wise, Jr. High School. His younger brother Tre Smith played defense at NCCU with him. In high school, Smith was a dual athlete playing football and basketball. He made up in his mind that football was the more logical sport to pursue in order to help his family pay for his college tuition. In a press conference shortly after he was drafted, Smith stated that if his plans of playing in the NFL hadn't come true, he would have joined the United States Marshals Service.

College career 
Smith attended North Carolina Central University (NCCU) from 2012 to 2015, playing in 45 games and starting 42. He set multiple team records for solo tackles (168) and kickoff return yard average (28.1). On top of that among NCCU career leaders, Smith finished sixth in tackles (263) and tied for 11th in passes defended with 31 (7 interceptions, 24 pass break-ups).

In his freshman season, he was redshirted and played in all 11 games, starting 8 of them. Smith ended his freshman season as NCCU’s second-leading tackler with 65 total takedowns, second with three interceptions and third with eight passes defended (three interceptions, five pass break-ups). Smith was selected to the College Sports Journal Football Championship Subdivision Freshman All-America team. Smith started all 12 games in his redshirt sophomore season. He ranked second on the Eagles and 19th in the MEAC with 88 total tackles (51 solo). He was also ranked number one on the team and ranked fourth in the MEAC with 3 fumble recoveries. In his redshirt junior campaign, he started all 12 games making the switch from safety to cornerback in his redshirt junior season. Smith tallied 58 total tackles and a team second-best 44 solo tackles. He was voted to the Preseason All-MEAC Third Team. As a redshirt senior, Smith started in 10 of 11 games as a cornerback, only missing the game against the Bethune-Cookman Wildcats. He ended the year ranking third in the MEAC with a team-best 11 passes defended (two interceptions and nine pass break-ups), and a total of 52 tackles (ranking second on the team with 38 solo tackles). Smith led the conference and ranked 10th in the nation with an average of 28.1 yards per kickoff return (14 for 394 yards, 1 touchdown).

Professional career

Tampa Bay Buccaneers

2016
The Tampa Bay Buccaneers selected Smith in the fourth round with the 108th overall pick in the 2016 NFL Draft. Smith was the 18th cornerback drafted in 2016. 

On May 5, 2016, the Tampa Bay Buccaneers signed Smith to a four-year, $2.93 million contract with a signing bonus of $592,161.

The Buccaneers immediately converted Smith to safety. Throughout training camp, Smith competed for a job as a backup safety against Isaiah Johnson, Kimario McFadden, and Elijah Shumate. Head coach Dirk Koetter named Smith the backup free safety, behind Bradley McDougald, to begin the regular season. On September 25, 2016, Smith made his professional regular season debut as the Buccaneers lost 37–32 against the Los Angeles Rams in Week 3. In Week 9, he recorded his only tackle of the season during a 43–28 loss against the Atlanta Falcons. He finished his rookie season in 2016 with one tackle in 14 games and zero starts.

2017
Following the 2016 season, the Buccaneers announced that Smith would be moved back to cornerback. During training camp, Smith competed to be the third cornerback on the depth chart against Javien Elliott, Jude Adjei-Barimah, Robert McClain, and Josh Robinson. Head coach Dirk Koetter named Smith the third cornerback on the depth chart to begin the regular season, behind Brent Grimes and Vernon Hargreaves.

On September 24, 2017, Smith earned his first career start in place of Brent Grimes who was sidelined due to a shoulder injury. Smith finished the Buccaneers’ 34–17 loss at the Minnesota Vikings with three solo tackles and one pass deflection. Smith started another two games in place of Grimes (Weeks 8–9) after Grimes re-injured his shoulder. In Week 9, he collected a season-high nine combined tackles during a 30–10 loss at the New Orleans Saints. In Week 10, Grimes became a starting cornerback for the remainder of the season after Vernon Hargrove suffered a hamstring injury and was subsequently placed on injured reserve on December 20, 2017. On November 26, 2017, Smith made a season-high eight solo tackles during a 34–20 loss at the Atlanta Falcons in Week 12. Smith was inactive for the Buccaneers’ Week 16 loss at the Carolina Panthers due to an ankle injury, but returned for the last game of the season the following week. He finished the 2017 NFL season with 62 combined tackles (51 solo), five pass deflections, and two forced fumbles in 15 games and ten starts.

2018
Smith attempted to retain his role as a starting cornerback during training camp, but saw heavy competition from Vernon Hargreaves and the Buccaneers’ second round picks in the 2018 NFL Draft, M. J. Stewart and Carlton Davis. Head coach Dirk Koetter named Smith the fourth cornerback on the depth chart to start the regular season, behind Brent Grimes, Vernon Hargreaves, and Carlton Davis.

In Week 2, Smith collected a season-high nine combined tackles and made two pass deflections during a 27–21 victory against the Philadelphia Eagles. On November 25, 2018, Smith broke up a pass attempt and made his first career interception as the Buccaneers defeated the San Francisco 49ers 27–9 in Week 12. Smith intercepted a pass by quarterback Nick Mullens, that was initially intended for wide receiver Dante Pettis, during the fourth quarter. Smith finished the season with 38 combined tackles (31 solo), five pass deflections, and one interception in 16 games and six starts.

2019
On July 10, 2019, it was announced Smith had been suspended for the first four games of the 2019 season for violating the NFL performance-enhancing substances policy. He was reinstated from suspension on September 30, and activated prior to Week 5.

2020
On March 30, 2020, Smith was re-signed by the Buccaneers. Smith played in all four games in the Buccaneers' playoff run that resulted in the team winning Super Bowl LV.

Los Angeles Chargers
On March 30, 2021, Smith signed with the Los Angeles Chargers. He was placed on injured reserve on September 6, 2021. He was activated on October 9. He suffered a torn ACL in Week 9 and was placed on season-ending injured reserve on November 13, 2021.

Indianapolis Colts
On September 27, 2022, Smith was signed to the Indianapolis Colts practice squad. He was released on October 25.

Tampa Bay Buccaneers (second stint)
On October 31, 2022, Smith was signed to the Tampa Bay Buccaneers practice squad. He was released on December 6.

Personal life 
Smith is a member of Kappa Alpha Psi fraternity.

Reference list

External links 
 NFL Scouting Combine profile
 Tampa Bay Buccaneers bio
 NCCU Eagles bio

1993 births
Living people
American football cornerbacks
American football safeties
German players of American football
Indianapolis Colts players
Los Angeles Chargers players
North Carolina Central Eagles football players
People from Clinton, Maryland
People from Upper Marlboro, Maryland
Players of American football from Maryland
Sportspeople from the Washington metropolitan area
Tampa Bay Buccaneers players